Towle Valley is the deep valley formerly occupied by the head of Towle Glacier, lying immediately west of Towle Glacier in the Convoy Range of Victoria Land. Mapped in 1957 by the New Zealand Northern Survey Party of the Commonwealth Trans-Antarctic Expedition (1956–58) and named by them for the USNS a large part of the New Zealand stores south in December 1956.

Valleys of Victoria Land
Scott Coast